Ali Squalli Houssaini (1932 in Fez – November 5, 2018) was the author of the lyrics of the national anthem of Morocco, "Hymne Chérifien", which he wrote in 1970.  He was also the author of numerous books.

A member of the Union of Moroccan Writers since 1967, Squalli received the Morocco Grand Prize in 1982 and the international prize of King Faisal of Saudi Arabia in children's literature in 1992.

References

1932 births
2018 deaths
Moroccan children's writers
National anthem writers
People from Fez, Morocco
20th-century Moroccan writers